Terra Incognita: Ambient Works 1975 to Present is a compilation of Boyd Rice music previously released under his own name as well as his alias NON.

Credits
Artwork By - Louise Downer
Compiled By - Boyd Rice
Edited By, Mastered By [Premastering] - Anne Carruthers, Paul A. Taylor
Engineer - Eric Radcliffe (tracks: 2, 11, 12), John Fryer (tracks: 2, 11, 12)
Mastered By - Denis Blackham
Other [Liner Notes] - Brian M. Clark
Photography - Boyd Rice
Recorded By - Naut Humon (tracks: 4), Bob Ferbreche (tracks: 6, 11)
Written-By - Boyd Rice, Frank Tovey (tracks: 2, 11, 12), NON (tracks: 1, 3 to 10, 13)

Track listing
"Solitude" - 3:14
"Extract 4" - 2:16
"Father's Day" - 5:44
"Immolation Of Man" - 4:32
"Sunset" - 3:38
"Arka" - 4:36
"Cruenta Voluptas" - 2:19
"Untitled 1" - 5:16
"A Taste Of Blood" - 2:14
"Untitled 2" - 4:56
"Extract 5" - 2:18
"Extract 12" - 4:12
"The Fountain Of Fortune" - 6:00

References
discogs.com article

Boyd Rice albums
2004 compilation albums